The 1999 Canadian Professional Soccer League season was the second season under the Canadian Professional Soccer League name. The season began on May 28, 1999, and concluded on October 2, 1999, with Toronto Olympians defeating Toronto Croatia 2-0 to claim their first CPSL Championship. The Olympians made history by becoming the first club in the league's history to achieve a treble. For the second straight season, they went undefeated for the entire season. The league also introduced their first All-Star match where the CPSL All-Stars faced the CSA Development team.

Changes from 1998 season 
All founding members of the CPSL returned with the exception of Mississauga Eagles P.S.C. The newest addition to the league were expansion franchise the Oshawa Flames. Other changes were Glen Shields changing their name to Glen Shields Sun Devils, and the York Region Shooters moving to Richmond Hill, Ontario.

Teams

Final standings

Playoffs

Bracket
The top four teams qualified for a one-game semifinal that led to the championship game played on October 2 at Oshawa Civic Stadium in Oshawa, Ontario.

Semifinals

CPSL Championship

All-Star game  
The league's inaugural all-star match was played on September 26, 1999 at Centennial Park Stadium in Toronto, Ontario. The CPSL All-Star team was selected from the six remaining clubs that didn't compete in the CPSL League Cup final, which excluded players from the Toronto Olympians and Toronto Croatia. The Canada Development team featured players from the CSA National Training Centre which consisted of senior national team players with a mix of young prospects with USL A-League experience.

1999 scoring leaders
Full article: CSL Golden Boot

CPSL Executive Committee 
The 1999 CPSL Executive Committee.

Awards

Weekly awards

Individual awards  

The CPSL held their second annual awards ceremony on November 21, 1999 at the Hollywood Princess in Concord, Ontario. The Toronto Olympians went home with the majority of the awards with 4 wins. David Gee along with Tony LaFerrara of London City won the Coach of the Year award. Gee became the first manager to win the award consecutively twice. Canadian internationals Elvis Thomas and Eddy Berdusco received the MVP and Golden Boot award. Toronto's final award was the Fair Play award for being the most disciplined team throughout the season. London City produced their fourth straight Rookie of the Year with Semir Mesanovic. While Toronto Croatia received their first CPSL club award with George Azcurra being named the Goalkeeper of the Year. Silviu Petrescu who later went on to officiate matches at the international level and Major League Soccer was recognized with the Referee of the Year award.

References

External links
Rocket Robin's Home Page of the 1999 CPSL Season

1999
1999 domestic association football leagues
Canadian Professional Soccer League